The spherical cow is a humorous metaphor for highly simplified scientific models of complex phenomena. Originating in theoretical physics, the metaphor refers to physicists' tendency to reduce a problem to the simplest form imaginable in order to make calculations more feasible, even if the simplification hinders the model's application to reality.

The metaphor and variants have subsequently been used in other disciplines.

History 

The phrase comes from a joke that spoofs the simplifying assumptions sometimes used in theoretical physics.

It is told in many variants, including a joke about a physicist who said he could predict the winner of any race provided it involved spherical horses moving through a vacuum. A 1973 letter to the editor in the journal Science describes the "famous story" about a physicist whose solution to a poultry farm's egg-production problems began with "Postulate a spherical chicken".

Cultural references 

The concept is familiar enough that the phrase is sometimes used as shorthand for the entire issue of proper modeling. For example, Consider a Spherical Cow is a 1988 book about problem solving using simplified models. A 2015 paper on the systemic errors introduced by simplifying assumptions about spherical symmetries in galactic dark-matter haloes was titled "Milking the spherical cow – on aspherical dynamics in spherical coordinates".

References to the joke appear even outside the field of scientific modeling. "Spherical Cow" was chosen as the codename for the Fedora 18 Linux distribution. In the sitcom The Big Bang Theory, a joke is told by Dr. Leonard Hofstadter with the punchline mentioning "spherical chickens in a vacuum", in "The Cooper-Hofstadter Polarization" episode.

See also 

 Assume a can opener
 Fermi problem
 Homo economicus
 Naïve physics

References

External links 
 NASA:Exploration of the Universe Division - Supernova models as spherical cows
 Hubble Heritage Gallery Page: related history from Space Telescope Institute

In-jokes
Scientific modelling
Metaphors referring to cattle
Humour in science
Fictional cattle
Theoretical physics